The AJX Bridge is a historic Pratt truss bridge in southwestern Johnson County, Wyoming. The bridge was built in 1931 across the South Fork of the Powder River near Kaycee, Wyoming. AJX Bridge was built to provide a river crossing for U.S. Route 87. It was placed on the National Register of Historic Places in 1985 as part of a Multiple Property Submission devoted to historic bridges in Wyoming.

Design
The Pratt truss bridge was invented in 1844 by Thomas and Caleb Pratt. A Pratt truss has vertical members and diagonals that slope down towards the center. The interior diagonals are under tension, and the vertical elements are under compression. Pratt truss bridges were the preferred design for medium-span vehicular bridges during the late nineteenth and early twentieth centuries. A truss bridge can carry the roadbed on top, in the middle, or underneath the truss. Bridges with the roadbed at the top or the bottom are the most common as this allows both the top and bottom to be stiffened, forming a box truss. When the roadbed is atop the truss it is called a 
deck truss. The AJX Bridge is a deck truss bridge, since the roadway is on top of the truss.

A cantilever bridge is a bridge built using cantilevers, structures that project horizontally into space, supported on only one end. The AJX bridge is the only surviving cantilevered deck truss bridge in Wyoming.

Construction
The AJX Bridge was built in 1931–32 by the Omaha Steel Works of Omaha, Nebraska, under a contract with the Wyoming Highway Department. There are pin connections between the two approach spans and the cantilever span.

Originally located on U.S. Route 87 (US 87), today the road has been renumbered as Interstate 25 service road. The future of the bridge is controlled by an agreement between the Federal Highway Administration, and several Wyoming state agencies. The AJX Bridge is rated as "structurally deficient" by the Federal Highway Administration.

Photo gallery

See also

List of bridges documented by the Historic American Engineering Record in Wyoming
List of bridges on the National Register of Historic Places in Wyoming
National Register of Historic Places listings in Johnson County, Wyoming

References

External links

Road bridges on the National Register of Historic Places in Wyoming
Bridges completed in 1931
Buildings and structures in Johnson County, Wyoming
Transportation in Johnson County, Wyoming
Historic American Engineering Record in Wyoming
National Register of Historic Places in Johnson County, Wyoming
U.S. Route 87
Steel bridges in the United States
Cantilever bridges in the United States
Pratt truss bridges in the United States